The Peach Belt Conference (PBC) is an athletic conference affiliated with the National Collegiate Athletic Association (NCAA) at the Division II level.  The 11 member institutions are located in the South Atlantic states of South Carolina, Georgia, and Florida.  In addition, seven affiliate members participate in one sport each; namely sports not sponsored by their home conferences.

Since its inception came in the 1990–91 school year, the Peach Belt has, across all sanctioned sports, produced 30 national champions and an additional 27 national finalists. Starting with only two championships in 1991, in men's and women's basketball, the conference has expanded to 16 championship sports with the addition of women's golf in the fall of 2009 and men's lacrosse in the summer of 2020.

History

The conference traces its roots November 1988 when 11 schools first met in Greenville, S.C. to form a Division II conference. Following a second meeting on Dec. 3, 1989, five of those 11 schools, plus two others, formed the Peach Belt Athletic Conference and began play in the fall of 1990.

The seven charter members of the conference were Armstrong Atlantic State University (now Armstrong State University), Columbus State University, Francis Marion University, Georgia College (now Georgia College & State University), Lander University, USC Aiken, and USC Upstate. The name Peach Belt Athletic Conference was adopted in January 1990 and modified to Peach Belt Conference in May 2000.

Augusta State University joined the conference as the eighth member in 1991 and UNC Pembroke became the ninth member on July 1, 1992. They were followed by Kennesaw State University on July 1, 1994, Clayton State University on July 1, 1995 and the University of North Florida on July 1, 1997. Kennesaw State and North Florida departed for the Division I ranks in 2005, USC Upstate did the same in 2007, and the conference welcomed in North Georgia College & State University in 2005 and Georgia Southwestern State University in 2006. In 2009–10, the University of Montevallo and Flagler College were added, returning a league presence to Florida and breaking new ground in Alabama. In 2012–13, the Peach Belt expanded to 14 members, the most the league has ever had, with the addition of Young Harris College. On January 8, 2013, the University System of Georgia finalized the mergers of two conference members into new institutions. Augusta State was merged into Georgia Regents University, which was renamed in 2015 as Augusta University, and NGCSU was merged into the University of North Georgia. In both cases, the new institutions inherited the Peach Belt memberships of the older schools.

The Peach Belt was less than a year old before capturing its first of many national championships. The Columbus State men's golf team took the honor by winning the 1992 national crown, the first of three golf championships the Cougars own. One year later, the Lander men's tennis team began their record-breaking run of eight straight national titles, the first PBC dynasty. Since then, USCA men's golf won three straight national titles from 2004 to 2006 while AASU women's tennis captured four titles overall.

The 2010–11 season was one of the most memorable the league has ever had. Clayton State became the first PBC women's basketball team to capture a national championship. Montevallo watched their men's basketball team reach the Elite Eight, eventually competing in the National Championship Game. Unfortunately, their run came to an end with a loss to Western Washington University. The Columbus State men's tennis team reached the national semifinals while the Clayton State and Armstrong Atlantic State women's tennis teams also played in the national semifinals. The North Georgia softball team made an unprecedented third straight appearance in the NCAA Women's College World Series, while Columbus State's Meshack Koyiaki registered a runner-up finish at the Men's Cross Country National Championships. In all, 46 Peach Belt teams made appearances in the NCAA postseason, including seven men's tennis teams and six each in the sports of men's golf and women's tennis.

David Brunk was named the second PBC commissioner in May 2007, replacing Marvin Vanover, who was the first PBC commissioner from 1991 to 2007. Brunk is charged with continuing the strong growth of the conference as its second era begins.

Dr. Kendall Blanchard, president of Georgia Southwestern State University, began the second of his two-year term as the league president in July 2011.

In April 2020, Francis Marion University and the University of North Carolina at Pembroke announced that they would leave the Peach Belt Conference starting in 2021–22, both joining Conference Carolinas.

On April 14, 2021, the conference invited the NAIA's University of South Carolina Beaufort to join in 2022–23 after applying for membership in Division II and gaining acceptance into the NCAA. By July 14, 2022, USCB was accepted into the NAIA's Continental Athletic Conference for its first year of provisional membership while still playing a Peach Belt schedule as part of the Sand Sharks' dual NAIA-NCAA membership. USCB is ineligible for a Peach Belt or NCAA postseason during the three-year transition.

The conference currently holds championships in 16 sports, eight for men and eight for women. The championship sports are men's and women's cross country, men's and women's soccer, volleyball, men's and women's basketball, men's and women's tennis, baseball, softball, men's and women's track & field, and men's and women's golf. Men's lacrosse was added on July 10, 2020, and its first season was in spring 2021.

Chronological timeline
 1989 - On December 3, 1989, the Peach Belt Conference (PBC) was founded as the Peach Belt Athletic Conference (PBAC). Charter members included Armstrong State College (later Armstrong Atlantic University before merging with Georgia Southern University), Columbus College (now Columbus State University), Francis Marion College (now Francis Marion University), Georgia College (now Georgia College & State University), Lander College (now Lander University), the University of South Carolina at Aiken (USC Aiken) and the University of South Carolina at Spartanburg (USC Spartanburg, now the University of South Carolina Upstate or USC Upstate) beginning the 1990-91 academic year.
 1991 - Augusta College (later Augusta State University, now Augusta University) joined the PBAC in the 1991-92 academic year.
 1992 - The University of North Carolina at Pembroke (UNC Pembroke) joined the PBAC in the 1992-93 academic year.
 1994 - Kennesaw State University joined the PBAC in the 1994-95 academic year.
 1995 - Clayton State University joined the PBAC in the 1995-96 academic year.
 1997 - The University of North Florida joined the PBAC in the 1997-98 academic year.
 2000 - The PBAC renamed by shortening its name to the Peach Belt Conference (PBC) in the 2000-01 academic year.
 2005 - Kennesaw State and North Florida left the PBC to join the Division I ranks National Collegiate Athletic Association (NCAA) and the Atlantic Sun Conference (A-Sun) after the 2004-05 academic year.
 2005 - North Georgia College & State University (now the University of North Georgia) joined the PBC in the 2005-06 academic year.
 2006 - Georgia Southwestern State University joined the PBC in the 2006-07 academic year.
 2007 - USC Upstate left the PBC to join the NCAA Division I ranks and the Big South Conference after the 2006-07 academic year.
 2009 - Flagler College and the University of Montevallo joined the PBC in the 2009-10 academic year.
 2012 - Young Harris College joined the PBC in the 2012-13 academic year.
 2012 - The University of Alabama in Huntsville, Nova Southeastern University and Shorter University joined the PBC as affiliate members for men's & women's outdoor track & field in the 2013 spring season (2012-13 academic year).
 2014 - The Florida Institute of Technology (Florida Tech) joined the PBC as an affiliate member for men's & women's outdoor track & field in the 2015 spring season (2014-15 academic year).
 2021 - Alabama–Huntsville and Shorter left the PBC as affiliate members for men's & women's outdoor track & field after the 2016 spring season (2015-16 academic year).
 2017 - Two members left the PBC to join their respective new home primary conferences: Armstrong State announced that it would discontinue its athletic program and would be merged into Georgia Southern University, and Montevallo rejoined the Gulf South Conference, both after the 2016-17 academic year.
 2017 - Embry–Riddle Aeronautical University joined the PBC as an affiliate member for men's & women's outdoor track & field in the 2018 spring season (2017-18 academic year).
 2019 - Two institutions joined the PBC as affiliate members: Albany State University for women's soccer, and Claflin University for baseball, both in the 2019-20 academic year.
 2021 - Francis Marion and UNC Pembroke left the PBC to join the Conference Carolinas after the 2020-21 academic year.
 2021 - Alabama–Huntsville and Shorter rejoined the PBC as affiliate members for men's lacrosse (with former full member Montevallo also rejoining that sport) in the 2022 spring season (2021-22 academic year).
 2022 - The University of South Carolina at Beaufort (USC Beaufort) joined the PBC beginning with the 2022-23 academic year.

Member schools

Current members
The PBC currently has 11 full members, with all but two being public schools.

Notes

Future member
The PBC will have one new full member, also a public school.

Notes

Affiliate members
The PBC currently has seven affiliate members, all but three are private schools:

Notes

Former members
The PBC has seven former full members, all are public schools:

Notes

Former affiliate members
The PBC has three former affiliate members, one was a public school, while two were private schools:

Notes

Membership timeline

Sports

Men's sponsored sports by school

Notes

Women's sponsored sports by school

Notes

Other sponsored sports by school

Notes

Championships

References

External links

 
Sports in the Southern United States